Fanzago's astronomical clock is an astronomical clock in Clusone, Italy. Dating from 1583, it was designed by local mathematician Pietro Fanzago, and still runs on its original mechanism, with restorations in 1873, 1928 and 2006.

It has a single hand, which rotates anticlockwise, and three concentric rotating rings inside the chapter ring. The dial indicates the hour, the day, the month, the position of the Sun and Moon in the zodiac, the moon phase, and the duration of the hours of darkness through the year.

The inscription underneath the dial is in Latin:

References

Astronomical clocks in Italy
Buildings and structures in the Province of Bergamo